Santhosh Kesavan Nayar is an Indian actor who appears in Malayalam cinema. He has acted in more than 100 films as villain, hero, second hero and as comedian as well.

Early life
Santhosh hails is from Thiruvananthapuram, India. He is the only son of retired headmaster C. N. Kesavan Nair and P. Rajalakshmiamma, who is also a retired teacher. He grew up along with his two sisters in Pettah, Thiruvananthapuram. Santhosh was brought up by his maternal grandparents, advocate K. S. Chellappan Pillai and B. Parukuttyamma, ever since his parents left to Ethiopia on deputation. He did his schooling at St. Joseph's Higher Secondary School, Thiruvananthapuram. Both his sisters turned out to be gynaecologists while he wanted to pursue a career as an actor. He graduated and post graduated in mathematics from Mahatma Gandhi College, Thiruvananthapuram. He was active in politics during his college days.

Film career

He made his debut through Malayalam movie Ithu Njangalude Katha directed by P. G. Viswambharan in 1982.

Personal life
He married Subhasree V., a high-school teacher by profession; they have a daughter, Rajasree S. Nayar.

Filmography

 1921: Puzha Muthal Puzha Vare (2023)
  On The Way (2014)
 Ginger (2013) as Ajith Kumar
  Sringaravelan (2013)
  Proprietors: Kammath & Kammath (2013)
  Nakhangal (2012)
  Madirasi (2012)
  Bhoomiyude Avakaashikal (2012)
  Kamal Perak (2012)
  Kaaryasthan (2010)
  I G Inspector General (2009)
  Kaakki (2007)
  Bus Conductor (2005)
  The Tiger (2005)
 Chandrolsavam (2005)
  Kochirajavu (2005)
  Vettam (2004)
  Freedom (2004)
  Runway (2004)
  Krishnaa Gopaalakrishnaa (2002)
  Kaathara (2000)
  Crime File (1999)
  Maanthrikam (1995)
  Oru Abhibhashakante Case Diary (1995)
  Sindoorarekha (1995)
  Kadal (1994)
  Chukkan (1994)
  Paalayam (1994)
  Avan Ananthapadmanaabhan (1994)
  Sainyam (1994)
  Gaandeevam (1994)
  Customs Diary (1993) as Dany
  Kauravar (1992)
  Ardram (1992) as Thaha
  Maanyanmar (1992)
  Thalastaanam (1992)
  Kaumaara Swapnangal (1991)
  Vishnulokam (1991)
  Koodikkaazhcha (1991)
  Kadathanadan Ambadi (1990)
  Crime Branch (1989)
  Peruvannapurathe Visheshangal (1989)
  Oru Muthassikkadha (1988) as Karuppayyan
  Ayitham (1988) as Govindankutty
  Chaaravalayam (1988)
  Maanasa Maine Varu (1987)
  Agnimuhoortham (1987)
  Irupatham Noottandu (1987)
  Caberet Dancer (1986)
  Snehamulla Simham (1986)
  Ente Shabdam (1986) as Abu
  Yuvajanotsavam (1986) as Nissar
  Nandi Veendum Varika (1986)
 Ithile Iniyum Varu (1986) as Kasim
  Kothi Theerumvare (1985)
  Ormikkaan Omanikkaan (1985)
  Kiraatham (1985) as Murali
  Kaattuthee (1985)
  Angadikkappurathu (1985) as Raghu
  Upaharam (1985)
  Akalathe Ambili (1985) as Edwin
  Daivatheyorthu (1985)
  Vasantha Sena (1985) as Mathews
  Ithu Nalla Thamaasha (1985) as Vjayakrishnan/Kuttappan
  Snehicha Kuttathinu (1985)
  Anakkorumma (1985) as Vikraman
  Eeran Sandhya (1985)
  Orikkal Oridathu (1985)
  Kandu Kandarinju (1985) as college bully
  Ivide Ee Theerathu (1985) 
  Ee lokam Ivide kure manushyar (1985) 
  Iniyum Katha Thudarum (1985) 
  Sandhyaykkenthinu Sindooram (1984)
  Kurishuyudham (1984) as Gunda
  Oru Sumangaliyude Kadha (1984)
  Nishedi (1984) as Sunny
  April 18 (1984)
  Ivide Thudangunnu (1984)
  Pinnilavu (1983)
  Naanayam (1983)
  Ithu Njangalude Katha (1982)

Television
Swapnam (Asianet)
Sreekrishnan (Surya TV)

References

 http://entertainment.oneindia.in/celebs/santhosh.html
 http://www.malayalachalachithram.com/profiles.php?i=1312
 http://www.malayalamcinema.com/star-details.php?member_id=326

External links

 Santhosh at MSI

Indian male film actors
Male actors from Thiruvananthapuram
Male actors in Malayalam cinema
20th-century Indian male actors
21st-century Indian male actors
Indian male television actors
Male actors in Malayalam television